Christopher Pile, a.k.a. The Black Baron, is a British programmer, born in 1969, living in Plymouth, Devon. He created the computer viruses 'Pathogen' and 'Queeg'. He was also a prolific programmer of the ZX Spectrum and MGT SAM Coupé 8-bit home computers, writing Pro-DOS, a CP/M emulator for the SAM, an implementation of the arcade game Defender, and the Dr Kode assembler for the ZX Spectrum, as well as Dr Scroll VTX5000 modem software.

From the mid to late 1980s Pile was writing Z80 code for the ZX Spectrum. Many of his programs were utilities: they included the Dr Kode editor/assembler, the Ultra208 high-capacity disk formatter for the ZX Spectrum +3 and software to allow any ZX Spectrum equipped with a VTX5000 modem to access the many on-line Bulletin Board systems (BBS) which were popular at the time. Pile also had several utility programs published in Your Sinclair magazine, including graphics routines for fast circle drawing and flood fill. Pile was also a contributor to the game hacking pages within the magazine.

Around 1990 Pile turned his attention to the newly released SAM Coupé home computer and wrote two pieces of software for it: ProDOS (a CP/M implementation) and a faithful clone of the arcade video game Defender.

In 1995, Pile was imprisoned for 18 months after being convicted of writing two PC computer viruses known as SMEG.Pathogen and SMEG.Queeg and the virus polymorphic engine known as SMEG.

The SMEG engine was produced as an object file which non-programmers could download and trivially link into an existing virus which, in turn, would make the resulting virus polymorphic and much harder to detect using anti-virus software. SMEG was also the first polymorphic engine with the ability to generate random CALLs to randomly generated subroutines within its encryptors. This gave the generated polymorphic code a more realistic appearance. SMEG also used exclusively 8086 machine language instructions, which meant it ran cleanly on any 80x86 based PC.

The name "Queeg", SMEG and Pathogen, as well as some of the virus activation messages, are from the British TV show Red Dwarf.

Towards the late 1990s Pile spent some time as a commercial games programmer, working mainly on the Nintendo Game Boy, Sega Game Gear and Master System consoles. In late 1997 Pile programmed a PC emulator for the arcade game Asteroids by Atari.

References

External links
Article from Crypt Magazine on Pile, 1996
A general description of the methods behind a polymorph engine, written by Pile under his Black Baron guise.
Chris Piles' Asteroids emulator for PCs
A page about Chris Pile's software for Z80-based computers
Defender, Chris Piles' Defender Game for the Sam Coupe

1969 births
Living people
Place of birth missing (living people)
English computer programmers
British computer criminals
Prisoners and detainees of England and Wales